USS LST-910 was an  in the United States Navy. Like many of her class, she was not named and is properly referred to by her hull designation.

Construction
LST-910 was laid down on 23 February 1944, at Hingham, Massachusetts, by the Bethlehem-Hingham Shipyard; launched on 8 April 1944; sponsored by Mrs. Gerald Donovan; and commissioned on 24 May 1944.

Service history
During World War II, LST-910 was assigned to the Asiatic-Pacific theater. She took part in the Battle of Surigao Strait, in October 1944; Lingayen Gulf landings, in January 1945; the Zambales-Subic Bay, in January 1945; the Consolidation and capture of Southern Philippines, the Palawan Island landings, in February and March 1945, and the Mindanao Island landings, in April 1945; and the Borneo operations, the Balikpapan operation, in June and July 1945.

Following the war, LST-910 performed occupation duty in the Far East and saw service in China until early April 1946. She returned to the United States and was decommissioned on 27 June 1946, and struck from the Navy list on 31 July, that same year. The ship was sold on 25 November 1948, to the Bethlehem Steel Co., Bethlehem, Pennsylvania, for scrapping.

Awards
LST-910 earned three battle star for World War II service.

Notes

Citations

Bibliography 

Online resources

External links
 

 

LST-542-class tank landing ships
World War II amphibious warfare vessels of the United States
Ships built in Hingham, Massachusetts
1944 ships